The Theban Tomb TT156 is located in Dra' Abu el-Naga', part of the Theban Necropolis, on the west bank of the Nile, opposite to Luxor. It is the burial place of the ancient Egyptian Pennesuttawy, who was a troop commander and superintendent of the Southern Desert Lands during the reign of Ramesses II in the Nineteenth Dynasty.

Tomb
The tomb was already known to Champollion. He had given it the number 43. 

The tomb consists of a hall, pillared hall, a shrine, and a burial chamber.
 In the hall are seated statues of Pennesuttawy and his wife the chantress of Amun, Maia.
 In the pillared hall Pennesuttawy appears before different gods and goddesses, including Maat, Nut, Re-Harakhti, and Shu.
 On the inner doorway to the shrine Pennesuttawy is shown with his wife Maia, his son the first stablemaster of His Majesty, Nakhtmin, and his daughter named Baketwerner who was a Chantress of Amun.
 The burial chamber is decorated with scenes on the north, east and south wall.

Finds from the tomb include a brick of Pennesuttawy (now in the Philadelphia University Museum). The tomb was later reused during the 21st Dynasty and the 22nd Dynasty.

See also
 List of Theban tombs

References

Theban tombs
Nineteenth Dynasty of Egypt